Carlos Alberto Álvarez (born 19 July 1941) is a former Argentine cyclist. He competed in the team pursuit event at the 1964 Summer Olympics.

References

External links
 

1941 births
Living people
Argentine male cyclists
Olympic cyclists of Argentina
Cyclists at the 1964 Summer Olympics
Place of birth missing (living people)